Robinson: Fiji was the seventeenth season of Expedition Robinson in Sweden, known as Survivor in some countries, and the first to air since 2015. This season starts off with sixteen contestants divided into two tribes of eight who are trying to win the grand prize of 500,000 SEK. This is the first season to be hosted by Swedish reality host Anders Öfvergård. The season premiered on 18 March and concluded on 27 May 2018 where Daniel "DK" Westlund won in a 7–2 vote against Henrik Norgren to be crowned the winner of Robinson.

Finishing order

Season summary  
One tribe (Team South) was plagued by conflict. One woman (Victoria) moved out of camp and made a camp of her own. DK was originally part of that tribe and was never involved in the conflicts. Everyone liked him. He was always positive and he was strong in challenges. The tribe was led by Pascal, an allround player that everyone also liked. He formed a romance with Nicoline. After a few votes, the tribe got rid of the sources of conflict but in a twist, DK was kidnapped and moved to Team North, and three jokers entered Team South, bringing new conflicts.

The main character of the season was Désirée, a young, short woman. She received much camera time and we often got to see the game through her point of view, likely because she always kept her sanity and because she had good relationships with every player. Just before the merge, she orchestrated a blindside on Pascal to get rid of a physical threat. However, Pascal continued the game as the first member of Gränslandet (The Borderland).

Team South came to the merge with only three of their original players. Two sides eventually formed. The biggest alliance was led by Henrik, a policeman who was the team leader of Lag Nord, known for being diplomatic and altruistic. He wanted the strongest players in the final. DK was on his side. Désirée never took sides. A few weak players tried to make a pact against the strong but one of them (Marie) flipped. She thought it immoral to let the least deserving player, Johan, remain in the game. Her decision saved DK.

Pascal won every duel in Gränslandet and made it to the final eight where knock-out challenges began. The last-place finisher was eliminated each challenge. After an unexpectedly strong challenge performance, Désirée qualified for plankan ("the plank", the traditional final challenge) alongside Henrik, DK and Pascal. Pascal fell off first and then Désirée. DK stood against Henrik at the final tribal council. The jury was skeptical about Henrik's diplomatic style. Some thought he brought it too far, avoiding conflict to the extent that his own personality never shined through. Some also disliked how controlling he was of his alliance. DK had not strategized much but had done well in challenges and everyone liked him as a person. He got 7 votes against 2.

Voting History

References

External links

Expedition Robinson Sweden seasons
TV4 (Sweden) original programming
2018 Swedish television series debuts
2018 Swedish television series endings